Wright City is a city in Warren County, Missouri, United States. Wright City is a small, semi-rural community area with primarily single-family housing, with some multi-family dwellings. The population was 3,119 at the 2010 census. It has a number of small stores and restaurants. It has various types of light to heavy industrial businesses.

History
Wright City was laid out in 1857, and was named after Dr. Henry C. Wright, a first settler. A post office called Wright City has been in operation since 1858.
The Southwestern Bell Repeater Station-Wright City was listed on the National Register of Historic Places in 2007.

Geography
Wright City is located at  (38.827878, -91.024280).

Demographics

2010 census
As of the census of 2010, there were 3,119 people, 1,178 households, and 823 families residing in the city. The racial makeup of the city was 87.0% White, 5.7% African American, 0.2% Native American, 0.4% Asian, 3.7% from other races, and 3.0% from two or more races. Hispanic or Latino of any race were 7.2% of the population.

There were 1,178 households, of which 41.9% had children under the age of 18 living with them, 46.5% were married couples living together, 16.5% had a female householder with no husband present, 6.9% had a male householder with no wife present, and 30.1% were non-families. 23.3% of all households were made up of individuals, and 6.5% had someone living alone who was 65 years of age or older. The average household size was 2.65 and the average family size was 3.10.

The median age in the city was 31 years. 29.5% of residents were under the age of 18; 9% were between the ages of 18 and 24; 31.4% were from 25 to 44; 21.2% were from 45 to 64; and 8.8% were 65 years of age or older. The gender makeup of the city was 49.1% male and 50.9% female.

2000 census
As of the census of 2000, there were 1,532 people, 608 households, and 403 families residing in the city. The racial makeup of the city was 88.77% White, 6.27% African American, 0.72% Native American, 0.07% Asian, 2.74% from other races, and 1.44% from two or more races. Hispanic or Latino of any race were 6.20% of the population.

There were 608 households, out of which 35.7% had children under the age of 18 living with them, 42.4% were married couples living together, 17.6% had a female householder with no husband present, and 33.6% were non-families. 29.4% of all households were made up of individuals, and 12.8% had someone living alone who was 65 years of age or older. The average household size was 2.52 and the average family size was 3.05.

In the city, the population was spread out, with 29.0% under the age of 18, 12.1% from 18 to 24, 30.1% from 25 to 44, 17.7% from 45 to 64, and 11.0% who were 65 years of age or older. The median age was 31 years. For every 100 females, there were 95.2 males. For every 100 females age 18 and over, there were 83.3 males.

The median income for a household in the city was $30,179, and the median income for a family was $35,563. Males had a median income of $28,977 versus $21,607 for females. The per capita income for the city was $17,153. About 12.5% of families and 14.6% of the population were below the poverty line, including 18.5% of those under age 18 and 14.3% of those age 65 or over.

Education 
Public education in Wright City is administered by Wright City R-II School District, which operates two elementary schools, one middle school, and Wright City High School. Liberty Christian Academy is a private institution for students in kindergarten through grade twelve.

Wright City has a public library, a branch of the Scenic Regional Library system.

Arts and culture
From 1992 to 2007, Wright City was home to the Elvis Is Alive Museum, run by Baptist minister Bill Beeny in his local general store, which explored Beeny's theory that the singer Elvis Presley is still living. In 2007, Beeny sold the museum's collection of artifacts on eBay, and the museum briefly reopened in Hattiesburg, Mississippi before being placed into storage.

Notable people
Two American theologians, the brothers Reinhold Niebuhr and H. Richard Niebuhr were born in Wright City in 1892 and 1894 respectively.

The actor Rand Brooks, best known for the role of Charles Hamilton in Gone with the Wind, was born in Wright City.

References

External links
 Historic maps of Wright City in the Sanborn Maps of Missouri Collection at the University of Missouri

Cities in Warren County, Missouri
Cities in Missouri